= Depression in cats =

Medical condition amongst cats

Grey fur cat with possible depression.

Depression in cats is a medical condition amongst cats. This happens due to moving houses or pain from kidney disease, diabetes or others.

== Signs and symptoms ==
Cats with depression tend to not eat or drink as much as they did and barely groom themselves.

== Causes ==
Causes of it can be from kidney disease, diabetes, heart disease, and more. Causes of this can also be moving houses which is completely different and unfamiliar to the cat.

== See also ==
- Depression (mood)
